Ricardo José Veiga Varzim Miranda (born 24 March 1994), commonly known as Ricardinho, is a Portuguese professional footballer who plays for Romanian club FC Voluntari as a right back.

Club career
Born in Barcelos, Ricardinho joined local Gil Vicente FC's youth academy at the age of 9. He made his senior debut in 2013 with Vilaverdense FC, competing in the third division.

After returning from his loan spell, Ricardinho played his first competitive game for Gil on 29 October 2014, featuring the full 90 minutes in a 1–1 home draw against Atlético Clube de Portugal for the season's Taça da Liga. He first appeared in the Primeira Liga on 11 January of the following year, starting and being replaced early into the second half of an eventual 2–1 home win over F.C. Penafiel.

Honours

FC Voluntari
Cupa României runner-up: 2021–22

Individual
Liga I Team of the Season: 2021–22

References

External links

1994 births
Living people
People from Barcelos, Portugal
Portuguese footballers
Association football defenders
Primeira Liga players
Liga Portugal 2 players
Segunda Divisão players
Gil Vicente F.C. players
Liga I players
FC Voluntari players
Portuguese expatriate footballers
Expatriate footballers in Romania
Portuguese expatriate sportspeople in Romania
Sportspeople from Braga District